Hartman Cider Press is a historic cider press located in Pike Township, Berks County, Pennsylvania.  The cider press and one-story plain wood-frame building on a stone foundation was built about 1835.  The building measures 35 feet by 15 feet and has a gable roof. 

The cider press had been in the Hartman family for five generations. It was donated by Edward Hartman and John Hartman to the American Folklore Society of Oley in March 1975. It was moved from its original location in Muhlenberg Township, 11 miles to the Keim Homestead in May 1975.

It was listed on the National Register of Historic Places in 1988.

References

Industrial buildings and structures on the National Register of Historic Places in Pennsylvania
Industrial buildings completed in 1835
Buildings and structures in Berks County, Pennsylvania
National Register of Historic Places in Berks County, Pennsylvania